Vladimir Grigorevich Kondra (born 16 November 1950) is a Russian former volleyball player who competed for the Soviet Union in the 1972 Summer Olympics, in the 1976 Summer Olympics, and in the 1980 Summer Olympics. After his retirement, he became a successful volleyball coach, working most notably in CSKA Moscow, Olympiacos and the French men's national team.

He was born in Vladikavkaz.

In 1972, he was part of the Soviet team which won the bronze medal in the Olympic tournament. He played all seven matches.

Four years later, in 1976, he won the silver medal with the Soviet team in the 1976 Olympic tournament. He played all five matches.

At the 1980 Games, he was a member of the Soviet team which won the gold medal in the Olympic tournament. He played all six matches.

He coached CSKA Moscow from 1988 to 1991, winning two CEV Champions League titles (1989, 1991) and three Soviet Championships (1989, 1990, 1991). In 1992 he became head coach of Greek powerhouse Olympiacos and coached them to 2 Greek Championships, 2 Greek Cups and 2 CEV Champions League Final Four participations (3rd place in 1993, 4th place in 1994).

External links
 
 

1950 births
Living people
Soviet men's volleyball players
Olympic volleyball players of the Soviet Union
Volleyball players at the 1972 Summer Olympics
Volleyball players at the 1976 Summer Olympics
Volleyball players at the 1980 Summer Olympics
Olympic gold medalists for the Soviet Union
Olympic silver medalists for the Soviet Union
Olympic bronze medalists for the Soviet Union
Olympiacos S.C. coaches
Sportspeople from Vladikavkaz
Russian volleyball coaches
Olympic medalists in volleyball
Russian men's volleyball players
Coaches of Russia men's national volleyball team
Medalists at the 1980 Summer Olympics
Medalists at the 1976 Summer Olympics
Medalists at the 1972 Summer Olympics